The Borovnica Viaduct is a former railroad viaduct in Borovnica, Slovenia.

History

The viaduct was completed in 1856 and spanned the Borovnica Valley along the route from Vienna to Trieste vie Ljubljana. During its construction and for some decades afterward it was the largest stone bridge in Europe. The structure was planned by Carl Ritter von Ghega and construction began in 1850, lasting until August 1856, when the first train crossed it. It was a two-story structure; the first story consisted of 22 arches, and the second story had 25 arches. It was supported by 24 columns built of dressed stone that stood on wooden pilings driven into the loamy marsh soil. The arches were built of brick. The construction required one million cubic feet of broken stone, five million bricks, and one million cubic feet of stone blocks.

The viaduct was in poor condition before the Second World War. Water had seeped into the viaduct for decades, weakening the bricks, and the oak pilings that supported it were beginning to rot, with the result that the entire structure was gradually settling. At the beginning of the Second World War in Yugoslavia, the withdrawing Yugoslav Army blew up part of the bridge; Italian forces replaced the missing part of the viaduct with an iron structure. After the Italians withdrew, German forces built a bypass route past the viaduct because of the danger posed by increasingly frequent aerial attacks. After the last major Allied aerial attack in 1944, the partially destroyed viaduct was not repaired. The railroad was rerouted to the edge of the Borovnica Valley in 1947, which is where it also runs today. The remaining part of the viaduct was gradually dismantled by 1950. Today only a single column of the viaduct remains, standing in the middle of Borovnica.

References

External links

Railway bridges in Slovenia
Bridges completed in 1856
Former railway bridges
Buildings and structures demolished in 1941
Buildings and structures in Inner Carniola
Arch bridges in Slovenia
Viaducts in Slovenia
Demolished buildings and structures in Slovenia